Army Wives is a 1944 American romantic comedy film directed by Phil Rosen.

Cast 
Elyse Knox as Jerry Van Dyke
Marjorie Rambeau as Mrs. Shannahan
Rick Vallin as Barney
Dorothea Kent as Louise
Murray Alper as Mike
Hardie Albright as Verne
Kenneth Brown as Pat Shannahan
Billy Lenhart as Billy Shannahan
Eddie Dunn as Sgt. Shannahan
Jimmy Conlin as Stan
Ralph Sanford as Burke
Dorothy Christy as Mrs. Lowry
Phil Warren as Benson
Ralph Lewis as Kirby

See also
List of American films of 1944

External links 

1944 films
American black-and-white films
1944 romantic comedy films
American romantic comedy films
Monogram Pictures films
Films directed by Phil Rosen
1940s English-language films
1940s American films